Amir Khair is a Brazilian economist, financial consultant and former Secretary of Finance of the city of São Paulo. He is a common commentator on the Brazilian newspaper of O Estado de S. Paulo. He has repeatedly criticized the high level of the interest rate charged by the banks in Brazil.

References

Living people
Brazilian economists
Year of birth missing (living people)
Place of birth missing (living people)